Ysaline Bonaventure was the defending champion, but chose not to participate.

Quirine Lemoine won the title after defeating Kateryna Kozlova 6–2, 6–3 in the final.

Seeds

Draw

Finals

Top half

Bottom half

References
Main Draw

Tevlin Women's Challenger - Singles